Sayew (also Spasm or X-Rated Sex Story: Fact or Fiction) is a 2003 Thai romantic comedy film about a naive female college student who works as a writer of erotic stories for a pornographic magazine.

Plot

Tao is a tomboyish university student who supports her studies by writing for her uncle's racy pulp pornographic magazine Sayew, despite the fact that she has never had sex herself. The magazine is struggling financially, so Tao's uncle, Dr. Porn, tells her she needs to spice up her stories or else be sacked.

After writing fantasies about her neighbors doesn't work, Tao takes the advice of her uncle and starts reaching for first-hand experience to draw on, turning to the macho magazine photographer and writer, Young Stallion. However, the sexually uncertain Tao also has fantasies about a female classmate, Mui.

Cast
 Pimpaporn Leenutapong as Tao
 Nuntawat Arsirapojcharnakul as Jon
 Anon Saisangcharn as Young Stallion
 Phintusuda Tunphairao as Mui
 Jutarat Atthakorn as Dr. Porn

Reception

Festivals and awards
Sayew was screened at several film festivals in 2003, including the Deauville Asian Film Festival, the Vancouver International Film Festival and the Stockholm International Film Festival. At the Seattle International Film Festival, the film won an honorable mention for the Asian Trade Winds Award.

External links

 

2003 films
2000s sex comedy films
Sahamongkol Film International films
Thai-language films
Thai LGBT-related films
Lesbian-related films
2003 directorial debut films
2003 comedy films
2003 LGBT-related films